Naya Zaher is a 1991 Hindi drama thriller movie of Bollywood directed by Jyoti Sarup. It was India's first Hindi feature film based on HIV/AIDS. The mode has given of an adult thriller, where the main villain in the film is not a person, but the disease, AIDS. The music of the film was composed by Kalyanji–Anandji.

Plot
The film revolves with the illegal way of drug smuggling and spreading HIV-AIDS virus.

Cast
 Navin Nischol
 Satabdi Roy
 Arjun (Firoz Khan) as Inspector Vikram
 Uttam Mohanty
 Shiva Rindani
 Disco Shanti
 Iqbal Durrani
 Alka Kubal

Soundtrack
The music was composed by Kalyanji–Anandji and released by Sonotone. Lyrics were penned by Indeevar, Maya Govind, Shail Chaturvedi and Vinoo Mahendra.

References

External links 
 

1991 films
1990s Hindi-language films
Films scored by Kalyanji Anandji
HIV/AIDS in Indian films